The 1980 Australian Rally Championship was a series of five rallying events held across Australia. It was the 13th season in the history of the competition.

George Fury and navigator Monty Suffern in the Datsun Stanza won the 1980 Championship.

Season review
The 13th Australian Rally Championship was held over five events across Australia, the season consisting of one event each for New South Wales, Victoria, Queensland, South Australia and Western Australia.  The 1980 season saw the Datsun Stanzas dominate the competition, taking out first, third and fourth places in the championship.  It was the fifth championship for Datsun in six years, with wins in all five rounds.  Colin Bond and John Dawson-Damer put up some opposition in their Ford Escort RS1800 but it was Datsun's and in particular Fury's year.

The Rallies

The five events of the 1980 season were as follows.

Round One – Commonwealth Bank Rally of the West

Round Two – Lutwyche Village Rally

Round Three – Akademos Rally

Round Four – Bega Valley Rally

Round Five – Donlee Rally

1980 Drivers and Navigators Championships
Final pointscore for 1980 is as follows.

George Fury – Champion Driver 1980

Monty Suffern – Champion Navigator 1980

References

External links
  Results of Snowy Mountains Rally and ARC results.

Rally Championship
Rally competitions in Australia
1980 in rallying